Schistura tubulinaris is a species of ray-finned fish in the genus Schistura, itis endemic to the Nam Theun of the Mekong basin in Laos.

References

T
Fish described in 1998